Konjikovići is a village in the municipalities of Lopare (Republika Srpska) and Tuzla, Tuzla Canton, Bosnia and Herzegovina.

Demographics 
According to the 2013 census, its population was 42, all Serbs, with 40 living in the Lopare part and 2 in Tuzla.

References

Populated places in Tuzla
Populated places in Lopare